Kiheka Township is one of eleven townships in Camden County, Missouri, USA.  As of the 2000 census, its population was 4,237.

Geography
It contains six cemeteries: Caviness, Davis, Hugo, Percival Memorial, Williams and Zion.

The stream of Watered Hollow Branch runs through this township.

Transportation
Kiheka Township contains one airport or landing strip, Heritage Landing Strip.

References

 USGS Geographic Names Information System (GNIS)

External links
 US-Counties.com
 City-Data.com

Townships in Camden County, Missouri
Townships in Missouri